Karen Andrea Soto Lugo (born May 26, 1992 in Maracaibo) is a Venezuelan model and beauty pageant titleholder who won Miss World Venezuela 2013. She represented Venezuela in Miss World 2013 in Bali, Indonesia on September 28, 2013 but failed to place.

Soto was crowned Miss World Venezuela 2013 during the first edition of Miss World Venezuela pageant, held on August 10, 2013 in Caracas. She was crowned by the outgoing titleholder Gabriella Ferrari and Ivian Sarcos, Miss World 2011.

Karen previously competed in Miss Venezuela 2010, representing Costa Oriental, where she placed in the Top 10.

References

External links
Miss Venezuela Official Website
Miss World Official Website
Miss Venezuela World 2013 crowning @ Youtube

1992 births
Living people
Venezuelan female models
Venezuelan beauty pageant winners
Miss World 2013 delegates
People from Maracaibo